Captains of the Clouds ( Shadows of Their Wings) is a 1942 American war film in Technicolor,  directed by Michael Curtiz and starring James Cagney. It was produced by William Cagney (Cagney's brother), with Hal B. Wallis as executive producer. The screenplay was written by Arthur T. Horman, Richard Macaulay, and Norman Reilly Raine, based on a story by Horman and Roland Gillett. The cinematography was by Wilfred M. Cline and Sol Polito and was notable in that it was the first feature-length Hollywood production filmed entirely in Canada.

The film stars James Cagney and Dennis Morgan as Canadian pilots who do their part in the Second World War, and features Brenda Marshall, Alan Hale Sr., George Tobias, Reginald Gardiner, and Reginald Denny in supporting roles. The title of the film came from a phrase used by Billy Bishop, the First World War fighter ace, who played himself in the film. The same words are also echoed in the narration of The Lion Has Wings documentary (1939).

A film on the ongoing Canadian involvement made sense for the American war effort. The film ends with an epilogue chronicling the contributions of the Royal Canadian Air Force (RCAF) to the making of the film.

Plot
Brian MacLean irritates fellow bush pilots Johnny Dutton, Tiny Murphy, Blimp Lebec, and British expatriate Scrounger Harris by outcompeting them for business in rugged Northern Ontario, Canada. In 1939, as the Second World War is beginning. Dutton, whose ambition is to start his own airline, flies by the book, but MacLean is a seat-of-the-pants kind of pilot, mirroring the differences in their personalities.

Dutton saves MacLean's life after he is struck in the head by a still-moving propeller while transporting a doctor under dangerous flying conditions. MacLean is grateful and joins Dutton in a temporary partnership to help Dutton earn the seed fund for his airline. When Dutton rejects MacLean's warning about his girlfriend Emily Foster, MacLean marries her in order to save Dutton from wrecking his life. Dutton, however, does not know this and abruptly ends their friendship. Dutton impulsively gives his savings to charity and enlists in the Royal Canadian Air Force.

Later, after hearing Winston Churchill's "We shall fight on the beaches" speech on the radio, MacLean and the other bush pilots enlist in the Royal Canadian Air Force, only to discover that they are considered too old for combat. They reluctantly agree to train as flight instructors for the British Commonwealth Air Training Plan. Their commanding officer is none other than Dutton. MacLean, with his brash and fiercely independent nature, clashes with the military way of doing things, and he is court-martialed and dismissed from the service for flying too low, resulting in a cadet being severely injured. For revenge, he and "Tiny" buzz the airfield when renowned Canadian First World War ace Air Marshal William "Billy" Bishop (playing himself) is speaking during the group's graduation ceremony. "Tiny" blacks out while pulling out of a dive, and his plane plummets into the ground, killing him. MacLean loses his pilot's license as a result.

Later, when two transport aircraft crash, killing all 44 ferry pilots aboard, there is an urgent need for pilots to ferry a group of unarmed Lockheed Hudson bombers from Gander to Britain. The flight instructors are assigned the task, but their numbers have to be supplemented with civilian pilots. MacLean uses "Tiny" Murphy's papers to participate. Dutton recognizes him, but as Emily has told him why MacLean married (and abandoned) her, they reconcile and Dutton permits him to fly.

Dutton commands a flight of five. Nearing the coast of the British Isles, they are attacked by a German Messerschmitt Bf 109 fighter. First, Blimp Lebec is shot down. Then after Scrounger, MacLean's navigator, is killed, MacLean uses his flying skills to crash his unwieldy bomber into the nimble fighter, sacrificing himself to save the others.

Cast

Production
During pre-production, Joseph W. G. Clark, the public relations director of the British Commonwealth Air Training Plan, was heavily involved in promoting a film project that was initially identified as "Bush Pilots" based on a script submitted by Canadian screenwriters. With RCAF backing, Hal Wallis and Jack Warner were approached in Hollywood to undertake a "patriotic film." Warner was enthusiastic, and began the task of casting a major star to front the project. After considering Raymond Massey, Errol Flynn, and Clark Gable, the decision was made to cast George Brent, but Warner Bros. was unsure whether he could carry the film. 

Numerous attempts to rewrite the script into a more acceptable form resulted in a final screenplay now titled "Captains of the Clouds". The name was borrowed from a Victory Loans speech given by Billy Bishop. The only holdup was casting, which was resolved when Warner persuaded its resident "cocky guy" (as producer Jerry Wald had dubbed him), 42-year-old James Cagney, to take on the lead male role.

This film was Cagney's first in Technicolor. His participation in the production has been characterized as reluctant, and he accepted only after his brother was taken on as an associate producer. He quipped, "I didn't like this story the last four times I did it and I don't like it now!" and feared that he was immersed in one of his trademark Warner Bros. "potboilers", playing a role he had reprised numerous times. However, in certain scenes, Cagney improvised. His loose interpretation is evident in a cabin scene when he is playing against his cronies. Cagney veers off the script, reverting to the cocky persona he had cultivated in countless earlier features.

Captains of the Clouds was produced with the full cooperation of the Royal Canadian Air Force to promote enlistment in the British Commonwealth Air Training Plan. (It was also intended as a rousing "war preparedness" film for American audiences, but by the time it was released, the U.S. was already at war; nevertheless it did serve as a showcase of the Canadian war effort.) The Warner Bros. principal cast and production crew of over 80 technicians, along with "half a million dollars of colour cinematography equipment," came from Hollywood, crossing into Canada on July 12, 1941. The film was shot from mid-July to mid-October 1941. Scenes filmed in Ottawa include several views of the historic Chateau Laurier hotel, Parliament, and the Cenotaph area.

Much of the early footage involved a number of bush planes at the Woodcliff Camp on Trout Lake in North Bay, Ontario, and nearby Camp Caribou on Jumping Cariboo Lake in Marten River, Ontario. The aerial sequences were under the direction of Paul Mantz, a long-time Hollywood stunt pilot, who used a Stinson Model A trimotor camera ship. MacLean's aircraft, CF-HGO on-screen, was a Noorduyn Norseman flown by veteran stunt pilot Frank Clarke (who doubled for James Cagney in flying scenes), Johnny Dutton's silver CF-NBP was an actual Fairchild 71C bush plane,  while Laurentian Air Service's Waco EGC-7 and AGC-8 cabin aircraft provided the other float planes. In addition, there was a Waco CJC, registered as CF-AVW (transformed into CF-JPY in the movie), which belonged to Albert Racicot, a Montreal-based plane dealer and aviation mechanics who, at the time, was also one of the several instructors hired by the Canadian government to train military pilots involved in World War II.

Principal photography did not go well; a number of incidents slowed production. One of the huskies that was key to a scene bit Morgan, opening up a gash on his hand. Cagney, in an uncharacteristic move, decided to forgo a stunt double and play the scene himself in which his character is struck by a whirling propeller. At first things proceeded smoothly, but when it came time for him to fall into the lake, he overdid it and suffered a real concussion, putting the 10-day shoot at North Bay, Ontario farther behind schedule. Weather was a constant challenge, and with the need to ensure continuity, small scenes became unnecessarily complex; as a result, a typical shooting day lasted almost into the night. One 30-second scene with all the principals running along the dock took an entire day to complete, with Cagney, Hale, and Tobias barely able to stand at the end of filming. With a Hollywood production in their midst, North Bay residents became such a persistent nuisance that the crew reverted to sending messages out of the location site by homing pigeons. 

The military background sequences were shot at RCAF Air Stations at Uplands, Trenton, Dartmouth, Jarvis, and Mountain View. The "Wings Parade" (officially the "Presentation of Wings Ceremony") filmed at the No. 2 Service Training School at RCAF Uplands was an actual graduation service for 110 RCAF cadets. It proved to be the most complex scene of the film. Over 100 Harvard training aircraft flew overhead in a salute to the graduates.

The climactic ferry mission was staged out over the Atlantic from RCAF Station Dartmouth using the base's operational Lockheed Hudson bombers, along with a repainted Hawker Hurricane that posed as the German Bf 109. Due to the prominent Luftwaffe markings on the RCAF fighter, special alerts had to be posted in order to prevent "trigger-happy" home defence gunners from firing at it.

Reception
Released in an era of patriotic films with overt propaganda themes, Captains of the Clouds received an enthusiastic public acceptance. Although it was a "Hollywood" production, the film premiered simultaneously on February 21, 1942 in New York, London, Ottawa, Cairo, Melbourne, Toronto, Winnipeg, and Vancouver, with RCAF pilots transporting film copies to all these cities. The public reaction can be partly attributed to the plot line that revolved around the unique Canadian wilderness and the bush pilot mystique. "So Full of Spectacle and Glory it Had to be Made in Technicolor!" was the ad copy that was used. The vivid aerial scenes filmed in Technicolor were another aspect of the expensive production that garnered critical attention. Reviews were mixed; while some critics felt the film suffered from a stagey plot and a forced romantic story line, the aerial scenes were considered the film's redeeming feature.

According to Warner Bros. records, the film earned $2,116,000 domestically and $1,312,000 in foreign markets.

Oscar nominations
Ted Smith and Casey Roberts were nominated for Best Art Direction- Interior Decoration, Color, and Sol Polito was nominated for Best Color Cinematography at the 1943 Academy Awards.

Music
The music score is by Max Steiner, and Harold Arlen wrote the title song (lyrics by Johnny Mercer), which is used as a march in the film. Later, "Captains of the Clouds" was adopted as an official song of the Royal Canadian Air Force, although its use today is largely ceremonial. The tune is also known for its use in Carl Stalling's music scores for various Warner Bros. Cartoons shorts.

Canada's unofficial national anthem, "The Maple Leaf Forever", by Alexander Muir, is also heard, as well as "O Canada", the de facto Canadian anthem since 1939, and official anthem since 1980.

Recording
The title song was the B side of a 1942 recording (Decca 4174) by Dick Powell, with Over There as the A side.

Aircraft disposition
Three of the aircraft used in the flying sequences survive: the wreckage of the Noorduyn Norseman is on display in the Canadian Bushplane Heritage Centre, Sault Ste. Marie, Ontario, Canada; the Fairchild 71 is now displayed in the Alberta Aviation Museum, Edmonton, Alberta, Canada; and the North American NA-64 Yale is in the No.6 RCAF Dunnville Museum, Dunnville, Ontario, Canada.

References

Notes

Citations

Bibliography

 Barris, Ted. Behind The Glory: The Plan that Won the Allied Air War. Markham, Ontario: Thomas Allen & Son Publishers, 2005. .
 Dunmore, Spencer. Wings For Victory. Toronto: McClelland and Stewart, 1994. .
 Captains of the Clouds (DVD). Burbank, California: Warner Home Video, 2007.
 Dolan, Edward F. Jr. Hollywood Goes to War. London: Bison Books, 1985. .
 Hardwick, Jack and Ed Schnepf. "A Viewer's Guide to Aviation Movies". The Making of the Great Aviation Films, General Aviation Series, Volume 2, 1989.
 Mauro, Rudy. "Captains of the Clouds: A Half-Century's Perspective on the First Canadian Air Epic." Journal of the Canadian Aviation Historical Society, Vol. 29, No. 2, Summer 1991.
 Mauro, Rudy. "Captains of the Clouds: Filming the Bush Flying Sequences of Canada's First Air Epic." Journal of the Canadian Aviation Historical Society, Vol. 29, No. 3, Fall 1991.
 Mauro, Rudy. "Captains of the Clouds: A Postscript." Journal of the Canadian Aviation Historical Society, Vol. 33, No. 1, Spring 1995.
 Mauro, Rudy. "Recovering the 'Cagney Norseman': Salvaging the Remains of CF-AYO after Four Decades." Journal of the Canadian Aviation Historical Society, Vol. 39, No. 1, Spring 2001.
 Metcalfe-Chenail, Danielle. For the Love of Flying: The Story of Laurentian Air Services. Montreal: Robin Brass Studio, 2009. .
 Orriss, Bruce. When Hollywood Ruled the Skies: The Aviation Film Classics of World War II. Hawthorne, California: Aero Associates Inc., 1984. .

External links
 
 
 
 
 
 Entry at impdb.org
 An actual aircraft used in the movie
 North Bay's Big Movie - Captains of the Clouds 1941

1942 films
1940s English-language films
1940s war films
American aviation films
American war films
Canadian Armed Forces in films
Films directed by Michael Curtiz
Films scored by Max Steiner
Films set in Northern Ontario
Films shot in Alberta
Films shot in Nova Scotia
Films shot in North Bay, Ontario
Films shot in Ottawa
Warner Bros. films
World War II aviation films
World War II films made in wartime